In mathematics, the Schauder estimates are a collection of results due to  concerning the regularity of solutions to linear, uniformly elliptic partial differential equations. The estimates say that when the equation has appropriately smooth terms and appropriately smooth solutions, then the Hölder norm of the solution can be controlled in terms of the Hölder norms for the coefficient and source terms. Since these estimates assume by hypothesis the existence of a solution, they are called a priori estimates.

There is both an interior result, giving a Hölder condition for the solution in interior domains away from the boundary, and a boundary result, giving the Hölder condition for the solution in the entire domain. The former bound depends only on the spatial dimension, the equation, and the distance to the boundary; the latter depends on the smoothness of the boundary as well.

The Schauder estimates are a necessary precondition to using the method of continuity to prove the existence and regularity of solutions to the Dirichlet problem for elliptic PDEs. This result says that when the coefficients of the equation and the nature of the boundary conditions are sufficiently smooth, there is a smooth classical solution to the PDE.

Notation 

The supremum norm of a continuous function  is given by

For a function which is Hölder continuous with exponent , that is to say,  the usual Hölder seminorm is given by

The sum of the two is the full Hölder norm of f

For differentiable functions u, it is necessary to consider the higher order norms, involving derivatives. The norm in the space of functions with k continuous derivatives, is given by

where  ranges over all multi-indices of appropriate orders. For functions with kth order derivatives which are Holder continuous with exponent , the appropriate semi-norm is given by

which gives a full norm of

For the interior estimates, the norms are weighted by the distance to the boundary

raised to the same power as the derivative, and the seminorms are weighted by

raised to the appropriate power. The resulting weighted interior norm for a function is given by

It is occasionally necessary to add "extra" powers of the weight, denoted by

Formulation

Interior estimates
Consider a bounded solution  on the domain  to the elliptic, second order partial differential equation

where the source term satisfies .

 for all 

and the relevant norms coefficients are all bounded by another constant 

Then the weighted  norm of u is controlled by the supremum of u and the Holder norm of f:

Boundary estimates
Let  be a  domain (that is to say, about any point on the boundary of the domain the boundary surface can be realized, after an appropriate rotation of coordinates, as a  function), with Dirichlet boundary data that coincides with a function  which is also at least . Then subject to analogous conditions on the coefficients as in the case of the interior estimate, the unweighted Holder norm of u is controlled by the unweighted norms of the source term, the boundary data, and the supremum norm of u:

When the solution u satisfies the maximum principle, the first term on the right hand side can be dropped.

Sources

Further reading
 
  

Elliptic partial differential equations